Hannes Manninen (born 20 December 1946) is a Finnish politician of the Centre Party, born in Kuusamo. He has been a member of the Parliament of Finland since 1995 and Minister of Regional and Municipal Affairs of Finland 2003–2007.

References

Mr. Hannes Manninen Conference of Parliamentarians of the Arctic Region

1946 births
Living people
People from Kuusamo
Centre Party (Finland) politicians
Government ministers of Finland
Members of the Parliament of Finland (1995–99)
Members of the Parliament of Finland (1999–2003)
Members of the Parliament of Finland (2003–07)
Members of the Parliament of Finland (2007–11)